Holger Oscar Christian Anders Guldager (16 September 1904 – 10 August 1986) was a Danish cyclist. He competed in two events at the 1924 Summer Olympics.

References

External links
 

1904 births
1986 deaths
Danish male cyclists
Olympic cyclists of Denmark
Cyclists at the 1924 Summer Olympics
Cyclists from Copenhagen